Charlotte Dome is a granite dome in California's Kings Canyon National Park.  It lies to the southeast of Glacier Monument and north of Bubbs Creek.  It is most easily accessed from the Onion Valley trailhead to the east.  The South Face Route is featured in Fifty Classic Climbs of North America. This climb is a grade III, class 5.7.

See also 
 Charlotte Lake

References

External links 
 
 
 

Granite domes
Climbing areas of California
Mountains of Kings Canyon National Park
Mountains of Fresno County, California
Rock formations of California
Mountains of Northern California